Noel Graham may refer to:

 Noel Graham (bowls) (born 1968), Northern Irish international lawn and indoor bowler
 Noel Graham (rowing) (born 1944), Irish rower